Darlington Ewaen Obaseki (born 1 January 1968) is a Nigerian Professor of Histopathology and the present Chief Medical Director of the University of Benin Teaching Hospital, Benin City.

Darlington Obaseki is an alumnus of the University of Benin School of Medicine. He is a gastrointestinal pathologist who has obtained post-Fellowship training in University Hospital, Basel (Switzerland) and Leeds General Infirmary. He has training in management locally and internationally (Administrative Staff College of Nigeria and Galilee International Institute of Management, Israel).

Background
Darlington Obaseki was born on 1 January 1968 in the city of Benin, Nigeria. He attended Ezomo Primary School (1974–1980), and Asoro Grammar School (1980–1985) both in Benin City. Darlington Obaseki proceeded into the University of Benin in 1985 where he received a Bachelor of Medicine and Surgery (MBBS) degree in 1991.

Medical career
After his house-officers' programme in 1992 at the Central Hospital, Benin City and subsequent mandatory one-year NYSC programme in 1993 at the Peretorogbene Health Centre, River State, Darlington Obaseki proceeded into working as Medical Officer at the Ituah Hospital, Festac Town, Lagos State in 1995 to 2001.

In 2001, Darlington Obaseki got admitted as a Registrar in the Department of Pathology of the University of Benin Teaching Hospital. He completed the training programme in 2006 by dint of hard work, satisfactory conduct and success at his Part II and Part I fellowship examinations of the West African College of Physicians (2004), and the National Postgraduate Medical College of Nigeria (2006) respectively.

In 2007, Darlington Obaseki got appointed as Honorary Consultant in the Department of Pathology of the University of Benin Teaching Hospital by his appointment as Lecturer in the Department of Pathology of the University of Benin. Darlington Obaseki rose to the position of Professor of Pathology in October 2017 after a decade of immerse scientific contributions in the field of medicine. He has attended numerous scientific conferences both within and outside Nigeria and has also presented articles and abstracts in these conferences.

Chief Medical Director
Darlington Obaseki got appointed as the 6th Chief Medical Director of the University of Benin Teaching Hospital on 17 August 2017 after acting in the same capacity for about a month. Before this appointment, Darlington Obaseki has serviced in other executive capacities like Ag Chairman Medical Adversary Committee (2017), Deputy Chairman Medical Adversary Committee (2014–2016) and Coordinator, UBTH Cancer Registry (2014 till Date).

Darlington Obaseki's administration ushered in most of the technological advancement currently witnessed in the Hospital, and his campaign for early referral of cases to the Hospital has also helped in mitigating the adverse health outcomes which have plagued the Hospital in the past.

Personal life
Darlington Obaseki is married to Mrs Chigozie Obaseki, a Physiotherapist by training and the couple is blessed with three children. He is a Christian, and a sports enthusiast, especially football and currently plays for Nigeria Medical Association All-Stars Football Club UBTH, to date. Darlington Obaseki is an opened minded individual with keen interest in the progress of people around him.

Publications
Darlington Obaseki has authored and co-authored some medical and scientific research publications in the field of medicine both locally and internationally.

See also
University of Benin Teaching Hospital (List of Chief Medical Director)

References

1968 births
Living people
Nigerian pathologists
University of Benin (Nigeria) alumni
People from Benin City